Hiroji Indulkar was a 17th-century architect under the Maratha Emperor Shivaji.  He is credited with building Raigad, the second capital of the Maratha Empire, and the sea fort Sindhudurg. He was also entrusted with the construction of fort Pratapgad along with Moropant Pingle.

Legacy 
It is said that when King Shivaji saw the fort of Raigad built by  Hiroji, he asked Hiroji what he wanted as a gift. Then Hiroji asked the King to gift him a small tile with the carving of his (Hiroji) name on it, accompanied by a condition, that the tile should be placed at the entrance of Jagadeeshwar Temple so that whenever the King visits the Temple, his foot would touch Hiroji's name and with that, the King will visit the temple daily. The tile mentioning the words "Seveche thayi tatpar, Hiroji Indulkar" (always ready for service, Hiroji Indulkar) can be seen at the footsteps of the entrance of Jagadeeshwar Temple.

In popular culture  
In movie Farzand, Hiroji Indulkar's role was performed by Rajan Bhise.

References

Citations

Sources 

17th-century Indian architects